Pantydwr railway station was a station to the north of St Harmon, Powys, Wales. The station was opened in 1864.

References

Further reading

Disused railway stations in Powys
Railway stations in Great Britain opened in 1864
Railway stations in Great Britain closed in 1962
Former Cambrian Railway stations